The Edison Sault Power Canal supplies the Saint Marys Falls Hydropower Plant, a Cloverland Electric Cooperative hydroelectric plant, in Sault Ste. Marie, Michigan. Excavation of the power canal began in September 1898 and was completed in June 1902.  The canal and hydroelectric complex were named a Historic Civil Engineering Landmark in 1983.

Physical features
The entrance to the canal is located at the eastern end of Ashmun Bay and is controlled by four steel headgates. The upper quarter of the canal was excavated from rock while the remainder was dug into the earth and given a timber lining. The canal is designed to carry  of water per second.

Further reading

References

Energy infrastructure completed in 1902
Buildings and structures in Sault Ste. Marie, Michigan